Antonio Maceo Airport  is an international airport located in Santiago, Cuba.

Overview
The airport has a drawing of Che Guevara on one of its outside walls. Pope John Paul II flew to this airport during his last visit to Cuba, flying a round trip between here and José Martí International Airport in Havana. Likewise, Pope Benedict XVI, during the second papal visit to Cuba, flew here for Mass and other activities, from his visit to León and Guanajuato in Mexico, before moving on to Havana.

The airport is basically a turbo-prop centre. Nevertheless, jet aircraft also fly to this airport. Most commercial flights into SCU are domestic, but there are about twenty international flights each week; while these international flights were at one point done mostly by domestic airlines, the international routes have nevertheless awakened the interest of some foreign airlines that have opened flights into this airport and might open more flights in the future.

Airlines and destinations

Santiago de Cuba Base
The airport was home to the Cuban Revolutionary Armed Forces:

 35th Transport Regiment - Antonov An-2 and Antonov An-26 transports
 36th Helicopter Regiment - Mil Mi-8 and Mil Mi-24

The helipads are now part of the executive jet terminal on the north end of the airport.

Accidents and incidents
 On 2 October 1959, a Viscount of Cubana de Aviación was hijacked on a flight from Havana to Antonio Maceo Airport, Santiago de Cuba by three men demanding to be taken to the United States. The aircraft landed at the Miami International Airport.
 On 4 November 2010, Aero Caribbean Flight 883, an ATR 72-212, crashed in the centre of the country with 68 people on board. The aircraft was flying from Santiago de Cuba to Havana when it went down. 28 foreigners were reported to be among the passengers. There were no survivors.

References

External links
 
 Puerto Rico-Cuba flights resume after decades - dead link - and this never happened did it ?
 Departures
 Arrivals

Airports in Cuba
Buildings and structures in Santiago de Cuba